The men's 400 metres event at the 2021 European Athletics Indoor Championships was held on 5 March 2021 at 10:13 (heats) and at 19:10 (semi-finals), and on 6 March 2021 at 20:10 (final) local time.

Medalists

Records

Results

Heats
Qualification: First 2 in each heat (Q) advance to the Semifinals.

Semifinals
Qualification: First 2 in each heat (Q) advance to the Final.

Final

References

2021 European Athletics Indoor Championships
400 metres at the European Athletics Indoor Championships